The Men's 20 kilometer Race Walk event at the 2000 Summer Olympics took place on Friday 22 September 2000 in Sydney, Australia.

Medalists

Abbreviations
All times shown are in hours:minutes:seconds

Records

Results

See also
2000 Race Walking Year Ranking

References

External links
Official Report of the 2000 Sydney Summer Olympics

Walk
Racewalking at the Olympics
Men's events at the 2000 Summer Olympics